Stephen Mark "Steve" McEveety (born November 4, 1954) is an American film producer, who has over 40 years experience in senior positions in the entertainment industry.

McEveety is one of six children, and attended Notre Dame High School and Loyola Marymount University. He and his wife Susie have four children. As a child, Steve McEveety appeared in episodes of the TV series' Gunsmoke, My Three Sons, and Star Trek ("Miri", 1966). Later, he worked as an assistant director and production manager.

McEveety worked many years at Mel Gibson's Icon Productions where he executive produced What Women Want, Payback, Anna Karenina, Immortal Beloved, The Man Without a Face and Braveheart, the last of which gained ten Academy Award nominations and received five Oscars. McEveety produced The Passion of the Christ, Airborne, which he also wrote, as well as 187, Paparazzi, and We Were Soldiers.

After completing an exclusive producing deal with Icon, McEveety partnered with David Segel, John Shepherd and Todd Burns to launch Mpower Pictures. The company's first release was the Toronto Award Winning Bella. McEveety produced An American Carol, written & directed by David Zucker, and The Stoning of Soraya M., written & directed by Cyrus Nowrasteh, that took 2nd Runner-up at the 2009 Toronto Film Festival. Through Mpower Pictures McEveety also produced the movie Snowmen (October 2011), which won the Tribeca Film Festival Audience Award, Runner-up, the Dallas International Film Festival Audience Award, the TIFF Sprockets Golden Sprocket Award and the Heartland Crystal Heart Award. Most recently, McEveety produced Machine Gun Preacher with Mpower Pictures, in association with a number of other companies.

In 2015, McEveety went on to produce Man Down, directed by Dito Montiel, starring Shia Labeouf, Gary Oldman, and Kate Mara. It was released by Lionsgate in late 2016.

Filmography
He was a producer in all films unless otherwise noted.

Film

Second unit director or assistant director

Production manager

Visual effects

As writer

Thanks

Television

Second unit director or assistant director

As an actor

Production manager

References

External links
 
 McEveety on "The Stoning of Soraya M.", CBN.com

1954 births
Living people
American male child actors
American film producers
People from Greater Los Angeles
Loyola Marymount University alumni
Place of birth missing (living people)
Unit production managers